The She-Camel of God in Islam was a miraculous female camel sent by God to the people of Thamud in Al-Hijr, after they demanded a miracle from the prophet Salih. The narrative and story of the she-camel is recorded in the Quran.

Quranic mention 

Amongst the many narrations in the Quran, one historical story deals with the people of Thamud, who lived after the people of ʿĀd in pre-Islamic Arabia. As the people of the community were heavily indulgent in idolatry, besides other issues, God sent the prophet and oracle Saleh to warn them of the impending doom that they would face if they did not mend their fraudulent ways.

See also 
 Animals in Islam
 Arabian Peninsula
 Dromedary
 Hejaz
 List of characters and names mentioned in the Quran

References 

Individual camels
Islamic legendary creatures
Islamic miracles
Quranic figures
Female legendary creatures